Ebeguowen "Owen" Otasowie (born January 6, 2001) is an American professional soccer player who plays as a defensive midfielder for Belgian First Division A team Club Brugge.

Club career

Wolverhampton Wanderers
After progressing from their youth academy, Otasowie made his senior debut for Wolverhampton Wanderers as a substitute in Wolves' final UEFA Europa League group match of the 2019–20 edition against Beşiktaş on December 12, 2019. On January 1, 2020, Otasowie signed a new two-and-a-half-year contract with Wolves.

On December 15, 2020, Otasowie made his Premier League debut for Wolves as a substitute on for Leander Dendoncker in a 2–1 home win over Chelsea, providing an assist for Wolves' first goal scored by Daniel Podence. Otasowie made his full Premier League debut in Wolves's next game, away at Burnley, on December 21, 2020.

Club Brugge
On August 20, 2021, he made a permanent move to Club Brugge of the Belgian First Division A for a reported fee of £3.5 million. Otasowie made his debut for Club on July 17, 2022, during their 2022 Belgian Super Cup victory over Gent.

International career
After representing the United States at the under-18 level, Otasowie received his first call up to the senior United States squad for matches against Wales and Panama in November 2020. He made his senior debut on November 12, 2020, coming on in the 87th minute of a 0–0 draw against Wales.

Otasowie is also eligible to represent England or Nigeria.

Personal life
He is a Burberry model. He is also of Nigerian descent.

Career statistics

Club

International

Honors
Club Brugge
Belgian Super Cup: 2022

References

External links
 
 

2001 births
Living people
Soccer players from New York City
American sportspeople of Nigerian descent
American soccer players
African-American soccer players
English footballers
Association football midfielders
United States men's international soccer players
United States men's youth international soccer players
Premier League players
Wolverhampton Wanderers F.C. players
Club Brugge KV players
American expatriate soccer players
American expatriate sportspeople in Belgium
Expatriate footballers in Belgium
21st-century African-American sportspeople